The Hyattsville City Police Department is the primary law enforcement agency in Hyattsville, Maryland in the United States, serving a population of 17,557 (2010 Census) residents and visitors within 2.7 square miles (7.0 km²) of the municipality. It is an internationally accredited, full-service department that maintains its own 24/7 Emergency Communications Section. Its current head is Chief Jarod J. Towers.

Police department

On June 30, 2017, the Hyattsville City Police Department began providing dispatch services to the neighboring Mount Rainier City Police Department.  (Mount Rainier PD had been dispatched by the Bladensburg Police Department for the past 20 years, after having decided it was more cost effective to have their officers dispatched by another police agency, rather than running an emergency communications center themselves.)

Rank structure
The Hyattsville City Police Department is a paramilitary organization with a rank structure similar to the United States military. The ranks of Corporal through Lieutenant are based on promotional testing.  The rank of Chief and Captain are appointed by the Mayor and Council.

The Hyattsville City Police Department's rank structure is as listed:

Training academy
Members of the Hyattsville City Police Department are professional law-enforcement officers who must meet established standards and successfully complete a rigorous training program as required by the Maryland Police Training Commission. Officer candidates receive this training at the Prince George's Community College Municipal Police Academy, a fully accredited police-training facility located in Largo, Maryland. Officer candidates are expected to maintain physical and mental discipline throughout the academy.

The standard training course covers subjects such as criminal and motor-vehicle law, accident investigation, first aid, abnormal psychology, traffic control, criminal investigation, defensive tactics, weapons qualifications and court procedures. Academy students are required to maintain a high academic standing during their twenty-four-week classroom training. Upon graduation, officers will have earned 15 college credits towards an academic degree and be assigned to Field Training Officers for an additional eight weeks of training. Thereafter, officers are eligible for assignment to any of the Hyattsville City Police Department's Patrol Squads.

Organizational structure
The Hyattsville City Police Department is currently divided into the following sections:
Patrol Division – The largest and most visible component of the Hyattsville City Police Department.  The Patrol Division is commanded by a Lieutenant or above and is made up of  patrol squads, each commanded by a Sergeant with assistance from a Corporal. Officers duties include but are not limited to responding for all calls for service, conducting area checks, investigating any suspicious activities, and enforcing motor vehicle laws within the city limits.
Canine Unit (K9)- K9 Officers are assigned to patrol squads to assist with a variety of situations to include apprehending fleeing suspects and detecting narcotics.
Criminal Investigation Division (CID) - The Criminal Investigative Division is composed of detectives who investigate major crimes within the city that require in-depth time and investigation.
Emergency Response Team (ERT) - The department's "SWAT" team. The officers that are assigned to the ERT are decentralized and are assigned to their respective squad or duty assignment. If the ERT is called for service those individual members assume their respective ERT duties.  (Previously the ERT was called the "Hard Entry & Tactics Team" or H.E.A.T. for short, however that changed in 2015 when the unit began providing services over and above basic high risk entries.)
Community Action Team (CAT) - The Community Action Team provides support and subject matter expertise in the area of crime prevention and avoidance. It conducts crime avoidance courses and welfare checks for businesses and residences. It also oversees the neighborhood watch program, D.A.R.E program, and provides a School Resource Officer (SRO) that is assigned to a school. The SRO serves as a counselor, mediator, and problem solver between the school and the students.

Specialized units and certifications
Hyattsville City Police Department specialized units and certifications are:

 Canine Unit (K9)
 Criminal Investigations Section (CIS)
 Emergency Response Team (ERT)
 Community Action Team (CAT)
 School Resource Officer (SRO)
 Field Training Officer (FTO)
 Firearms Instructor
 Bicycle Patrol 
 Segway Patrol
 Honor Guard 
 Accreditation Unit
 Public Affairs Unit
 Crime Scene Unit/Evidence-Property Technician (CSU)
 Technical Services Section
 Office of Accreditation & Professional Standards
 Electric bike Unit

Equipment

Weapons
Hyattsville City police officers are currently issued a H&K VP9, X26 Taser, ASP collapsible baton, OC spray, handcuffs, and portable radio. Some officers are also issued/certified to use an 870 Remington 12 gauge shotgun and or an AR-15 Patrol Rifle. DW

Patrol vehicles
The Hyattsville City Police Department currently uses the police package Chevrolet Impala, Dodge Charger, Dodge Magnum, and Ford Interceptor Sedan & SUVs.

References

External links

Hyattsville, Maryland
Municipal police departments of Maryland